Medieval Cairo may refer to:

 History of Cairo during the Middle Ages
 Islamic Cairo, part of central Cairo